Jóska Sobri or Jóska Zsubri (born József Pap; 1810 – 17 February 1837) was a Hungarian bandit. He became a legendary outlaw in Transdanubia, Kingdom of Hungary. Fifty years after his death, people still spoke of his passing and some thought he was still alive.

Sobri, like Sándor Rózsa, is one of the most famous Hungarian betyárs (bandits).

References

Hungarian outlaws
1810 births
1837 deaths
19th-century Hungarian people